The Addiction Tour 2006 is the first live DVD by the Italian gothic metal band Theatres des Vampires. It features ten songs recorded during the tour in 2006 and also features an interview with Sonya Scarlet, as well as two music videos the band had recorded for the songs "Lilith Mater Inferorum" and "Angel of Lust". The live songs were also released as a live album in the band's next release, Desire of Damnation.

Track listing

Line-up 
Sonya Scarlet − vocals
Fabian Varesi − keyboards
Gabriel Valerio − drums
Zimon Lijoi − bass
Robert Cufaro − guitars

Theatres des Vampires albums
2007 video albums